Ain't That a Shame is a studio album by Pat Boone. it was released in 1964 on Dot Records.

According to the AllMusic review by Arthur Rowe, the album is compiled of "leftovers from various recording sessions" from 1960–1963, with the exception of the title track, Boone's 1955 hit "Ain't That a Shame", appearing "in its original version with added reverb".

Track listing

References 

1964 albums
Pat Boone albums
Dot Records albums